is a Japanese Shintoist grouping. Its sacred mountain is Mount Ontake. It was founded by Shimoyama Osuke. It had 3 million members in 1930. The numbers have fallen below one million. Its headquarters has been moved from Tokyo to Futana-cho in the city of Nara.
 Ontake-kyo has special rites. It is strongly influenced by the values of the Meiji era.

It is considered a Mountain worship group of Sect Shinto alongside Jikkō kyō and Fuso-kyo

References

Shinto in Japan
Shugendō
Shinto new religious movements
Shinbutsu shūgō
Mountain faith
13 Shinto Sects
Shinto denominations